O'Doherty is a surname, part of the O'Doherty family. Notable persons with that surname include:

Brian O'Doherty (born 1928), Irish art critic, writer, artist, and academic
Sir Cahir O'Doherty (1587–1608), last Gaelic Lord of Inishowen in Ireland
Chris O'Doherty (born 1951), known as Reg , New Zealand-born artist and musician
Claudia O'Doherty (born 1983), Australian actress and comedian
David O'Doherty (born 1975), Irish stand-up comedian
Éamonn O'Doherty (republican) (1939–1999), Irish republican and author
Éamonn O'Doherty (sculptor) (1939–2011), Irish sculptor and painter
Ellen O'Doherty (religious) (1894-1983), Australian superior general of Sisters of Charity
Gemma O'Doherty, Irish investigative journalist
Hugh O'Doherty (died 1924), Irish nationalist politician
Ian O'Doherty, Irish columnist
James Edward O'Doherty (1848–1932), Irish lawyer and politician
Jarrod O'Doherty, rugby league footballer
Jim O'Doherty, American television producer, writer and actor
Joseph O'Doherty (1891–1979), Irish politician
Ken O'Doherty (born 1963), former professional footballer
Kevin Izod O'Doherty (1823–1905), Irish-Australian politician
Malachi O'Doherty (born 1951), Irish journalist, author and broadcaster
Martin O'Doherty (born 1952), retired hurler
Mary Eva O'Doherty (1826–1910), married name of Mary Eva Kelly, Irish-Australian poet and writer
Mary-Jean O'Doherty, American-born coloratura soprano
Maurice O'Doherty (1932–1998), Irish broadcaster and newsreader
Michael O'Doherty (publisher), Irish talent judge, newswriter and publisher
Michael J. O'Doherty (1874–1949), Irish archbishop in Manila, Philippines
Orla O'Doherty, Irish squash player
Pat O'Doherty, Australian professional rugby league footballer 
Peter O'Doherty (born 1958), New Zealand and Australian musician
Philip O'Doherty (politician) (1871–1926), MP for North Donegal 1906–18
Rosa O'Doherty (1588–1660), birth name of Rosa O'Neill, member of the O'Doherty family
Stephen O'Doherty (born 1959), Australian politician
Thomas O'Doherty (1877–1936), Irish bishop of Clonfert and Galway
Tony O'Doherty (born 1947), Irish footballer and manager

See also
 O'Doherty's Rebellion, a 1608 uprising 
 Doherty (surname)
 Doherty (disambiguation)

Irish families
O'Doherty
Anglicised Irish-language surnames